Stacy Jones is a singer, songwriter, and guitarist for the band American Hi-Fi.

Stacy Jones may also refer to:
Stacy Jones (baseball) (born 1967), baseball player 
Stacy Jones, a fictional character played by Didi Conn in Thomas and the Magic Railroad

See also
Stacey Jones, rugby player